Count Zsigmond Széchenyi of Sárvár-Felsővidék (23 January 1898 — 24 April 1967) was a Hungarian hunter, traveler and writer. An outstanding figure of the Hungarian hunting culture. He hunted in Africa, India, Alaska and various parts of Europe. His outstanding hunting trophy is a world record addax. His hunting library is the collection of the most significant hunting textbook in Hungary, which can currently be viewed in the Hungarian Museum of Natural History.

Biography

Family and marriages

Széchenyi was the descendant of the Széchenyi family of the Roman Catholic nobility, Szárvár-Hinterland. His father, Count Viktor Széchenyi of Sárvár-Felsővidék (1871–1945), was the chief lord of Fejér County and the free royal city of Székesfehérvár. His mother was Count Karolina Ledebur Wicheln (1875–1956). His paternal grandparents were Count Dénes Széchenyi (1828–1892), a member of the Main House, Member of Parliament, and Count Mária Hoyos (1838–1926), an imperial and royal palace lady. His maternal grandparents were Count János Ledebur Wicheln (1842–1903), imperial and royal chamberlain, ministerial councilor, grand landowner of Mosschau, and Count Czernin von und zu Chudenitz Karonia (1847–1907), imperial and royal palace lady. His brothers: Count László Esterházy and Mrs. Countess Sarolta Antónia Széchenyi ("Sarah"), Count Irma Széchenyi, Count Czernin von und Zu Chudenitz Count Márta Széchenyi, and Count Széchenyi.

Count Zsigmond Széchenyi was the great-grandson of the founder of the Hungarian National Museum, Count Ferenc Széchényi. His great-grandfather was Count Lajos Széchényi, who was the brother of Count István Széchenyi, the "greatest Hungarian".

His first marriage was with Stella Crowther (Wimbledon, London, England, July 24, 1913 – † Henfield, West Sussex, England, December 27, 1990); on June 2, 1936, which happened in the Sigismund Chapel in Buda, Budapest. The swearing-in ceremony was performed by Lajos Shvoy, Bishop of Székesfehérvár. In afternoon, after the wedding, the wedding crowd had lunch at the Park Club, then the young couple traveled to the village. Their son, Count Péter Széchenyi, was born in London on February 4, 1939, and three of them lived in Hungary. Stella Crowther and his son Péter Széchenyi moved back to their homeland at the beginning of the war. During the siege of Budapest, together with the values of their villa in the name of his wife, their home was burned to the ground, Zsigmond Széchenyi lived in his father's house in Budavár until his deportation. On March 13, 1945, he was taken by the Soviet authorities, held in a camp in Tisza Kálmán - Republic Square, and then in Csömör until April 19, 1945.

Meanwhile, during one of his interrogations at the Mosonyi prison, he coincidentally met with his father, who had died two days before his release from abuse in captivity. He divorced his wife in 1945. From 1947 he became a hunting supervisor and then a specialist museologist until 1950, he was however still the hunting supervisor of the National Forest Center. In 1951 he was deported to Tiszapolgár in a henhouse - even the hens were in it when he arrived. After five months, he was able to move to another forced residence, Balatongyörök, where his acquaintances made an acceptance statement. In November 1952, he was deported by the police to Keszthely, then to Veszprém, and to the Budapest tolonhouse in early December. At the beginning of April, he was transferred to the Sopronkőhida prison for two months, then returned to the tolonha, from where he was released on 13 June. He had to move back to Balatongyörök, where he lived until the spring of 1959, there he met his second wife, Margit Hertelendy.

Under the communist regime, he got a job with help from a friend at the Keszthely Helikon Library, where he could hunt again. His second wife, Margaret Hertelendy (Pacsa, Zala County, March 26, 1925) was from a divorced family from Hertelend and Vindornyalak of ancient Transdanubian origin. The couple married on 5 May 1959 in Keszthely. Margaret worked in the Keszthely Helikon Library along with Zsigmond; her first husband, Miklós Birck, was an agricultural engineer whom Margaret had a daughter, Eszter Birck. Margaret Hertelendy's father, József Hertelendy (1889–1933) from Hertelend and Vindornyalak, was a judge in Perlak, a member of the county committee, a landowner from Pacsa, and her mother was Margit Szentmihályi (1894–1977) from Révfalva. The paternal grandparents of Margaret Hertelendy; József Hertelendy (1855–1907) from Hertelend and Vindornyalak, was a member of the Zala County Legislature, a landowner, and a knight, her grandmother was Elvira Kucinic (1859– †?). Margaret's maternal grandparents were Dezső Szentmihályi (1863–1935), a landowner, member of the Upper House AND vice-president of the "Zalavármegyei Economic Association", and Ilona Koller (1871–1934).

Margaret Hertelendy's ancestor was György Hertelendy (1764-1831), an alias of Zala, who was the guardian of Ferenc Deák and his brothers when they were orphaned. No child was born from the marriage of Count Zsigmond Széchenyi and Mrs. Margaret Hertelendy.

Education

He spent his childhood in Sárpentele, Fejér County (now Sárszentmihály), and in his Austrian and Czech relatives' homes in Gutenstein, Milleschau and Niemes. He completed his secondary schools at the State High School in Székesfehérvár, and then at the Ferenc József High School in Budapest.

He graduated in 1915, then was immediately enlisted and served in the World War I from 1916 to 1918. He then began his legal studies, but stopped in 1919 because his life was considered to be the study of nature and fauna. He completed his higher education in Munich and Stuttgart between 1920 and 1921, and in 1922 and 1923, in Oxford and Cambridge, he expanded his language and zoological knowledge.

World War II and afterwards

Between 1924 and 1932, he farmed on Kőröshegy in Somogy County, at which time his first African animal gathering and hunting expedition fell. In the spring of 1927, he hunted with László Almásy in Sudan, then hunted in Egypt, Libya, Kenya, Tanganyika and Uganda. Alaska followed in 1935, India in 1937–38, and Africa again in 1938. He suffered great losses during World War II. His villa on Istenhegyi út in Budapest burned down and his trophy collection was destroyed. From 1947; he worked as a hunting supervisor at the National Forestry Center. In 1950 at the Agricultural Museum, he was a specialist museologist, but in 1951 he was relocated to a farm next to Polgár in Hajdú County. He suffered a lot of injustice in the Rákosi era, but then in the 1950s he entered the Keszthely Helikon Library, where he worked on a professional bibliography on hunting literature in four languages. In 1955, the Fiction Publishing House published "Csui! ..." which had been published for a quarter of a century. His wife Margit Hertelendy began to write again to encourage him.

In 1960 he went on an official state expedition to East Africa (with István Dénes, János Szunyoghy, Imre Schuller and Kornél Böröczky). He arrived in Africa for the ninth but also last time in 1964. In the last years of his life he was given to have his work recognized under socialist regime as well. János Kádár also hunted with him several times. He died on April 24, 1967, in Budapest. His specialist library miraculously survived World War II, counting more than 4,000 volumes at the time of his death. Zsigmond Széchenyi's hunting library is the most significant collection of hunting books in Hungary, which was purchased by the Ministry of Agriculture in 1969 for the Natural History Museum.

Hunting trips

Europe 
Between 1915 and 1930, he hunted red deer mainly in the Bakony, Vértes and Kőröshegy estates in Hungary and therefore traveled to the Carpathians. He visited Transylvania regularly from 1941, mostly to the Grand Distress in Marostorda, where, in addition to deer, he hunted bears, roe deer, wild boar in Tyrol, where he visited year after year to hunt chamois and grouse. During his travels in Europe, he visited several countries, including black grouse in Scotland, Alpine ibex in Italy, and so on.

Africa 

 1927 His first hunting trip to Africa took place with László Almásy as his companion in the eastern half of Sudan in the Kassala province near the Abyssinian border. His account of this is in the second part of his book; Following in the Footsteps of Deer.
 1928 His hunt in November at Buff and Rhino Camp, next to the Ewaso Ng'iro River in Kenya, in the Maasai Reserve happened with; leopard, lion, buffalo, African elephant, impala, rhino. His first book, Chui, tells about this journey. Here he dropped the largest elephant party ever killed by a Hungarian hunter - weighing 133 and 1/2 pounds, 134 and 1/2 pounds. In this hunt, his partner was István Károlyi.
 1929 in March he was following the elephants in the Kitui countryside, Kenya.
 1932 November - March 1933: He returned to Kenya, where he hunted mainly elephants, bongos, antelopes and lions. This and his journey in the winter of 1933 are commemorated in his book African Campfires.
 1933 November - March 1934: In Kenya, he hunted cape buffalo in the northern Ewaso Ng'iro area, a large booby on Mount Khulal, an elephant at christmas, and then again a buffalo and a lion.
 1935 January - March: He took part in an expedition led by László Almásy in the Libyan desert in Sudan, where he hunted antelope with Jenő Horthy. He shot his world record-breaking Addaxa here. His desert experiences were captured in his book Rolling Sand.

He hunted a Nubian ibex in Egypt returning from India in 1938, according to his Two Goats book.

Asia 
December 1937 - March 1938: He summarized his hunting experiences in India in his book Nahar.

North America 
In the summer of 1935, he hunted moose in Alaska along with Kodiak bear, Canadian wild sheep, and caribou.

Memorial 
In 2014, the Széchenyi Sigismund Hunting Museum was opened in the Grassalkovich Castle in Hatvan, in which the Széchenyi Sigismund Memorial Room was also created with his personal objects and memories.

Works

Hungarian

Other languages 

 Land of Elephants (London)
 Tusschen dieren Gouddelvers (Amsterdam)
 Alaska (Münich)
 Bergteufel und Wüstenböcke (Salzburg)
 Nahar kral 'dzungle (Bratislava)
 Poloval somma Alaske (Bratislava)
 Wie es begann... (Salzburg)
 Feiertage (Salzburg)

References

Hungarian hunters
20th-century Hungarian writers
People from Oradea
1898 births
1967 deaths
Zsigmond